

Events
James J. Hines, the leader of Tammany Hall, the New York City Democratic organization, goes to prison for arranging political protection for Dutch Schultz's policy and numbers rackets in Harlem, New York.
Brooklyn mobster Seymour "Blue Jaw" Magoon agrees to become a government informant and provides information on the Murder, Inc. organization.
After a failed attempt on his life, New Jersey racketeer Max Rubin agrees to cooperate with law enforcement.
Brooklyn racketeer James "Dizzy" Feraco is murdered by rival gunmen.
February 2 – Abe "Kid Twist" Reles, a member of Murder, Inc., is arrested.  District Attorney William O'Dwyer charges Reles with robbery, assault, possession of narcotics, burglary, disorderly conduct, and eight charges of murder. In exchange for a reduced sentence, Reles would agree to testify against the members of Murder, Inc., and provides information on the National Crime Syndicate. Phil and Martin Goldstein, Emmanuel Weiss, and Murder Inc. leader Louis "Lepke" Buchalter are some of the mobsters who would be convicted by Reles' testimony.
April – George Scalise, New York labor racketeer and president of the Building Service and Employee's International Union of New York, is indicted for extortion.
May 23 – Murder, Inc. members Harry Maione and Frank Abbandando, based on the testimony of Abe Reles, are convicted of the 1937 murder of Brooklyn loan shark George "Whitey" Rudnick. While the decision would be overturned on appeal, a second trial would find them guilty and result in death sentences for both men.
July 31 – Whitey Krakower, a government informant, is murdered by New York mobster Benjamin "Bugsy" Siegel.

Arts and literature
Black Friday (film) starring Boris Karloff and Bela Lugosi.
Brother Orchid (film) starring Edward G. Robinson, Humphrey Bogart and Ralph Bellamy.
Castle on the Hudson (film) starring John Garfield and Pat O'Brien.
It All Came True (film) starring Humphrey Bogart.
Johnny Apollo (film) starring Tyrone Power, Edward Arnold, Lloyd Nolan and Lionel Atwill.
Queen of the Mob (film) starring Ralph Bellamy and Jack Carson.

Births
March 23 – Thomas Bilotti "The Rug", Gambino crime family underboss
May – Alphonso Sgroia "The Butcher", New York mobster
October 27 – John Gotti "The Dapper Don"/"The Teflon Don", Gambino crime family leader
December 29 – Charles Majuri "Big Ears", DeCavalcante crime family member

Deaths
James Feraco "Dizzy", New York (Brooklyn) racketeer
July 10 – Fred Burke aka Frederick Dane "Killer", Member of Egan's Rats and freelance syndicate hitman
July 31 – Whitey Krakower, government informant

Organized crime
Years in organized crime